Charles Waters (b. May 29, 1787 Vermont; d. September 9, 1869) was a farmer, merchant and political figure in Upper Canada. He represented Prescott in the Legislative Assembly of Upper Canada from 1835 to 1836 as a Reformer.

Waters was the son of Abel Waters, who served in the King's American Dragoons. He married Maria Frost. Waters served in the county militia, was a justice of the peace and coroner for the Ottawa District. He helped write the Seventh Report for the Grievances Committee. On Jan. 23, 1835, Wm. Lyon MacKenzie was given the appointment to move forward with the Grievances Report. Waters thought of MacKenzie as one of his most trusted friends. He died in L'Orignal, Canada West.

References 
Johnson, JK Becoming Prominent: Regional Leadership in Upper Canada, 1791-1841 (1989)  pp. 233–4

1787 births
1869 deaths
Members of the Legislative Assembly of Upper Canada
Canadian coroners